Enchanted Vagabonds is a book written by Dana and Ginger Lamb, published in 1938. It describes the adventures of an American couple traveling by canoe from North America to Central America. The book details some of their daily routine, adventures and travails, survival methods, dangers and people met. It was one of the best selling non-fiction books of 1938.

References

Further reading
 Dana and Ginger Lamb. Enchanted Vagabonds. New York, London. Harper & Bros., 1938. 

American travel books
1938 non-fiction books